Dezső Hiszékeny (born in Tatabánya, Hungary on February 22, 1956) is a Hungarian politician. He has been a Member of Parliament for the Hungarian Socialist Party since 2014 serving at the National Assembly of Hungary. Between 2006 and 2014 he served as the Deputy Mayor of 13th district of Budapest.

Early life and career 
He graduated from the Vocational High School of Mechanical Engineering in 1974 and then worked at BRG as a technical manager. He was later employed by the Hungarian Ship and Crane Factory. He graduated from the College of Public Administration in 1988 with a degree in administrative organization. He also worked as an entrepreneur. Since 2014 he has been a Member of Parliament of the Hungarian Socialist Party. From 2006 to 2014, he was the deputy mayor of the 13th district of Budapest.

Parliament 
He was elected member of parliament in the National Assembly of Hungary representing the Budapest 7th constituency between 2014 and 2018. In the Hungarian pre-election of 2021, he contested again in Budapest 7th constituency and won.

Criminal case 
In 2013, Hiszékeny was allegedly involved in a bribery case over the lease of a municipal owned business premises. According to the indictment, Hiszékeny asked for HUF5 million for the lease of a municipally owned business premises, but a secret recording obtained by an undercover agent did not support the allegations. The prosecution's accusation is mainly based on the fact that in one conversation with the undercover agent, Hiszékeny nodded when he brought the bribe, while in another conversation, a longer silence showed five fingers showing off the five million bribe. An expert found that the prosecutor's transcript of the audio recordings of the indictment was "incomplete and ambiguous." The charges against him were subsequently dropped.

References 

Living people
1956 births
People from Tatabánya
21st-century Hungarian politicians
Hungarian Socialist Party politicians
Members of the National Assembly of Hungary (2018–2022)